Szpęgawa  is a village in the administrative district of Gmina Tczew, within Tczew County, Pomeranian Voivodeship, in northern Poland. It is located within the ethnocultural region of Kociewie in the historic region of Pomerania.

The village has a population of 638.

History
Szpęgawa was a private church village of the monastery in Pelplin, administratively located in the Tczew County in the Pomeranian Voivodeship of the Polish Crown.

During the German occupation of Poland (World War II), in 1939–1940, several Poles from Szpęgawa, including a teenage boy, were among the victims of large massacres of Poles carried out by the Germans in the Szpęgawski Forest as part of the Intelligenzaktion.

Transport
The Polish Voivodeship road 224 runs through the village, and the A1 motorway runs nearby, west of the village.

References

Villages in Tczew County